Terese Delany (m. Kennedy) is a retired Australian women's basketball and netball player.

Biography

Delany played for the Australia women's national basketball team at the 1967 FIBA World Championship for Women, hosted by Czechoslovakia. Delaney retired from representative basketball in 1968. She then turned her attention to netball and was named vice-captain of Australia’s triumphant team at the 1971 Netball World Cup held in Jamaica. In 1979, Delany became the first netballer to be inducted into the NSW Hall of Champions.

References

Living people
Australian women's basketball players
Year of birth missing (living people)
Australian netball players
Australia international netball players
Netball players from New South Wales
1971 World Netball Championships players
1979 World Netball Championships players